Shelley most often refers to:

 Percy Bysshe Shelley (1792–1822), a major English Romantic poet and husband of Mary Shelley
 Mary Shelley (1797–1851), an English novelist and the wife of Percy Shelley
 Shelley (name), a given name and a surname

Shelley may also refer to:

Film and television
 Shelley (film), a 2016 Danish film
 Shelley (TV series), a British sitcom that first aired in 1979
 Shelley (American Horror Story), a character on American Horror Story

Music 

 Shelley (musician) (Shelley Marshaun Massenburg-Smith, born 1988), a German-born American musician
 Shelley (band) or Orlando, a British 1990s band

Places 
 Shelley, Victoria, a former town in the Shire of Towong, Australia
 Shelley railway station, Victoria, a closed station
 Shelley, Western Australia, a suburb of Perth
 Shelley, British Columbia, Canada
 Shelley, Essex, England
 Shelley, Suffolk, England
 Shelley, West Yorkshire, England
 Shelley railway station
 Shelley, Idaho, U.S.
 Shelley's Laserdome, former nightclub in Stoke-on-Trent, England

Other uses
 Shelley Potteries, a British pottery business
 MV Shelley or Empire Rancher, a ship

See also
 Rule in Shelley's Case, a rule of law about property and trusts in common law jurisdictions
 Shelly (disambiguation)